Margaret Elizabeth Wright (20 February 1940 – 22 June 2012) was a Green Party politician and from 2008 to 2012 a city councillor for Abbey Ward on Cambridge City Council in England. She was one of the Principal Speakers of the Green Party, a post she held with Darren Johnson, from 1999 to 2003.

She was several times elected by the Eastern Region of the Green Party to the first place on their list for the European Parliament.

Wright was born in Newcastle-upon-Tyne, then studied history at Bedford College, London, and teaching at the University of Oxford.  Later in life, she also obtained a master's degree in art history from Birkbeck College.  She moved to Cambridge with her three children and joined the Ecology Party in 1979, this later becoming the Green Party.

Margaret Wright contested the Cambridge constituency for the Green Party in both 1987 (the first time the Greens contested the seat) and 1997, gaining 1.1% and 1.3% respectively. She was Press Officer for Cambridge Green Party, and also served on the national executive of the Green Party, relating to international issues, and, fluent in French and German, the International Committee.

References

Green Party of England and Wales parliamentary candidates
1940 births
2012 deaths
Politicians from Newcastle upon Tyne
Councillors in Cambridgeshire
Alumni of Bedford College, London
Alumni of the University of Oxford
Women councillors in England